Gotthard Fedor August Heinrici (25 December 1886 – 10 December 1971) was a German general during World War II. Heinrici is considered as the premier defensive expert of the Wehrmacht. His final command was Army Group Vistula, formed from the remnants of Army Group A and Army Group Center to defend Berlin from the Soviet armies advancing from the Vistula River.

Early life and career
Heinrici was born in 1886 at Gumbinnen in East Prussia, the son of a minister of the (Protestant) Evangelical Church in Germany. He came from a long line of East Prussian theologians, including his uncle Georg Heinrici and his grandfather Carl August Heinrici, and remained a devout Lutheran throughout his life. Following graduation from secondary school in 1905, he broke from family tradition and joined the army on 8 March 1905 as a cadet in an infantry division. From 1905 to 1906, Heinrici attended a war school. During World War I, Heinrici fought in the German invasion of Belgium and earned the Iron Cross 2nd Class in September 1914. Heinrici's division was then transferred to the Eastern Front. There, he fought in the First Battle of the Masurian Lakes and the Battle of Łódź, receiving the Iron Cross 1st Class in July 1915.

In May 1916, Heinrici took part in the Battle of Verdun. Beginning in September 1916, he served in General Staff positions with the XXIV Reserve Corps and the 115th Infantry Division. In March 1917, Heinrici was posted to the German General Staff. In September, he attended a General Staffs officer training course, and later served as a staff officer with VII Corps and the VIII Corps. In February 1918, Heinrici was posted to an infantry division, serving as a staff officer responsible for operations. In this position, he was awarded the Prussian Knight's Cross of the Royal House Order of Hohenzollern with Swords in August 1918.

Heinrici had two children, Hartmut and Gisela, with his wife Gertrude. He was a devout Protestant who regularly went to church. His religious faith and refusal to join the Nazi party made him unpopular with the Nazi hierarchy and led to clashes with Hitler and Reichsmarschall Hermann Göring, who scorned him. Because Heinrici's wife Gertrude had a Jewish parent, their children were labeled Mischlinge (partly Jewish) under Nazi racial law. However, Heinrici received a "German Blood Certificate" from Hitler himself, which validated their supposed "Aryan" status and protected them from discrimination.

World War II
During the Battle of France, Heinrici's command was part of General Wilhelm Ritter von Leeb's Army Group C. He commanded the XII Army Corps which was part of the 1st Army. Heinrici's forces succeeded in breaking through the Maginot Line south of Saarbrücken on 14 June 1940.

In 1941, during Operation Barbarossa, Heinrici served in the 4th Army under Günther von Kluge as the commanding general of the XXXXIII Army Corps during the Battle of Białystok–Minsk, the Battle of Kiev and the Battle of Moscow. He received the Knight's Cross of the Iron Cross in 1941. Late in January 1942, Heinrici was given command of the 4th Army. On 24 November 1943 he was awarded the Oak Leaves to his Knight's Cross for his leadership during the Battle of Orsha, during which the 4th Army taking defensive positions near the Orsha region in Belarus, temporarily halted the advance of the Western Front led by General Vasiliy Sokolovsky. During the 4th Army's retreat, it inflicted heavy losses on the advancing Red Army. These successes contributed greatly to Heinrici's reputation as a defensive specialist. Later in 1943 he refused to obey an order to destroy the city of Smolensk by fire before the German army's retreat, and he was temporarily dismissed from his post as commander.

General Gotthard Heinrici wrote in his diary:"Hampered by the snow and especially the snowdrifts, often shoveling ourselves out metre by metre, and traveling with vehicles and equipment that are by no means adequate for the Russian winter, behind us the enemy pressing on, concern to bring the troops to safety in time, to carry the wounded along, not to let too many weapons or too much equipment fall into enemy hands, all this was sorely trying for the troops and their leaders...Kitted-out with fabulous winter equipment, the Russians everywhere push through the wide gaps that have opened up in our front...The retreat in snow and ice is absolutely Napoleonic in its manner. The losses are similar."
In 1944, after the previous successes of the Red Army in Ukraine, Heinrici repeatedly argued for the retreat of Army Group Center and a concomitant shortening of the front line, Hitler rejected these plans at a staff meeting on 20 May 1944. On 4 June Heinrici was relieved of command of the 4th Army, which was later encircled east of Minsk and nearly destroyed during Operation Bagration.

In the summer of 1944, after eight months of forced retirement, Heinrici was sent to Hungary and placed in command of the 1st Panzer Army; as well as the Hungarian First Army which was attached to it. He was able to keep the 1st Panzer Army relatively intact as it retreated into Slovakia. Later in 1944 during the Battle of the Dukla Pass, the 1st Panzer Army prevented Soviet forces from linking up with Slovak rebel forces of the concurrent Slovak National Uprising. Heinrici was awarded the Swords to the Oak Leaves of his Knight's Cross on 3 March 1945.

Retreat from the Oder
On 20 March 1945, Adolf Hitler replaced Heinrich Himmler with Heinrici as Commander-in-Chief of Army Group Vistula on the Eastern Front. Indicating that he was ill, Himmler had abandoned his post on 13 March and retired to a sanatorium at Lychen. At this time, Army Group Vistula's front was less than 50 miles from Berlin.

Army Group Vistula consisted of two armies: the 3rd Panzer Army led by General Hasso von Manteuffel and the 9th Army led by General Theodor Busse. Heinrici was tasked with preventing a Soviet attack across the Oder River amid shortages of manpower and material. Only the terrain itself favoured Heinrici; he dug the 9th Army into three defensive lines atop Seelow Heights, overlooking the sandy, swampy banks of the Oder. Manteuffel's 3rd Panzer Army, which had fewer panzers than the 9th, was similarly positioned in the north to delay a possible flanking strike by Marshal Konstantin Rokossovsky's 2nd Byelorussian Front.

On 16 April the Battle of the Oder-Neisse began. The Soviets attacked with about 1,500,000 men for what they called the "Berlin Offensive Operation". During the Battle of Berlin, Heinrici withdrew his troops westward and made no attempt to defend the city. By late April, Heinrici ordered the retreat of his army group across the Oder River. Hitler only became aware of the retreat of Army Group Vistula around 21 April, after a puzzling request by Heinrici, who sought permission to move his headquarters to a new site, which was further west than Berlin.

Dismissal
On 28 April Field Marshal Wilhelm Keitel, commander-in-chief of the Wehrmacht, was riding along the roads north of Berlin when he noticed that troops of the 7th Panzer Division and of the 25th Panzergrenadier Division were marching north, away from Berlin. These troops were part of General Hasso von Manteuffel's 3rd Panzer Army. As one of the two armies which made up Heinrici's Army Group Vistula, it was supposed to be on its way to Berlin. Instead, Heinrici was moving it northward in an attempt to halt the Soviet breakthrough at Neubrandenburg, contrary to orders of Keitel and his deputy, General Alfred Jodl. Keitel located Heinrici on a road near Neubrandenburg, accompanied by Manteuffel. The encounter resulted in a heated confrontation that led to Heinrici's dismissal by 29 April for disobeying orders.

Heinrici was replaced by General Kurt Student. General Kurt von Tippelskirch was named as Heinrici's interim replacement until Student could arrive and assume control of Army Group Vistula. Student was captured by the British before he could take command. The rapidly deteriorating situation that the Germans faced meant that Army Group Vistula's coordination of the armies under its nominal command during the last few days of the war was of little significance.

Heinrici was dismissed by Keitel for refusing to save Hitler. He was summoned to Berlin and would have complied had Captain Hellmuth Lang not persuaded him to "drive as slowly as you can" to Plön instead, informing him that he would be murdered in Berlin like Rommel (who had been Heinrici's adjutant, and later Lang's commander). Heinrici then gave himself up to British forces on 28 May.

Post-war life
After his capture, Heinrici was held at Island Farm, a British prisoner of war camp at Bridgend, South Wales, where he remained, except for a three-week transfer to a camp in the United States in October 1947, until his release on 19 May 1948. In the 1950s, he helped create the Operational History (German) Section of the United States Army Center of Military History, established in January 1946 to harness the operational knowledge and experience of German prisoners of war for the United States Army. He was also featured prominently in Cornelius Ryan's 1966 book, The Last Battle. Heinrici died in 1971 in Karlsruhe and was buried with full military honours at the Bergäcker cemetery in Freiburg im Breisgau.

Legacy
Despite being married to a half-Jewish (Mischling) woman, Heinrici supported many Nazi nationalistic and fascistic policies including the Lebensraum concept of territorial expansion, but disagreed with many of their racial policies. He was shocked by the anti-Jewish pogroms of Kristallnacht, although this did not lead him to distance himself from the Nazi regime.

On the eve of Operation Barbarossa, Heinrici, on receiving the Commissar Order, justified it as easing pressure on the front lines through the exercise of "preventive terror" in the rear. Heinrici wrote home to his family that the Soviet soldier fought "very hard", he concluded that Soviet soldiers were "a much better soldier than the Frenchman. Extremely tough, devious and deceitful." He repeatedly ignored "scorched-earth" orders, such as the order to destroy the historically significant city of Smolensk.

As a military commander, historians have described him as the premier defensive expert of the Wehrmacht and a genius admired by his peers, whose present-day obscurity could be due to his being, in the words of Samuel W. Mitcham, "as charismatic as a 20-pound sack of fertilizer".

In 2014, Heinrici's private letters and diaries were published in the book A German General on the Eastern Front: The Letters and Diaries of Gotthard Heinrici 1941-1942 edited by Johannes Hürter. In his writings, Heinrici revealed his growing doubts about Hitler's strategy and his mounting concern as the Wehrmacht was implicated in war crimes and the first actions of the Holocaust. 

Hürter writes that Heinrici proved to be a tough and capable commander who demanded as much of himself as his soldiers. As an army commander, Heinrici constantly maintained personal contact with combat troops on the front. In doing so, he corresponded to the Prussian-German (and also Hitler's) ideal of a high-ranking troop commander who led "from the front", and combined the skills of a general staff officer with the boldness of the front-line officer. Heinrici's personal writings from the Eastern Front bear eloquent testimony to this, as well as to the empathy and care he had for his soldiers, for whom he felt responsible. Regarding crimes committed in Heinrici's area of ​​command in the Soviet Union, Hürter writes that despite Heinrici's growing respect for the fighting power of the enemy and a burgeoning understanding of the devastated population, it did not change the fact that war crimes such as the execution of commissars also occurred in Heinrici's area of ​​command.

Awards
 Prussian Iron Cross of 1914: 2nd Class (27 September 1914) & 1st Class (24 July 1915)
 Prussian Royal House Order of Hohenzollern, Knight's Cross with Swords (9 August 1918)
 1939 Clasp to the Iron Cross: 2nd Class (13 May 1940) & 1st Class (16 June 1940)
 Knight's Cross of the Iron Cross with Oak Leaves and Swords
Knight's Cross on 18 September 1941 as General der Infanterie and commanding General of XXXXIII Army Corps
 Oak Leaves on 24 November 1943 as Generaloberst and Commander-in-Chief of the 4th Army
 Swords on 3 March 1945 as Generaloberst and Commander-in-Chief of the 1st Panzer Army

References
Citations

Bibliography

External links
 
 
 

1886 births
1971 deaths
People from Gusev
People from East Prussia
Colonel generals of the German Army (Wehrmacht)
Recipients of the clasp to the Iron Cross, 1st class
Recipients of the Knight's Cross of the Iron Cross with Oak Leaves and Swords
German Army personnel of World War I
Prussian Army personnel
German prisoners of war in World War II held by the United Kingdom
Reichswehr personnel
20th-century Freikorps personnel